Voltea pa' que te enamores is a telenovela produced by Venevisión International in co-production with Univision. It is an adaptation of the Venezuelan telenovela produced between 2006 and 2007 Voltea pa' que te enamores. Filming began in June 2014.

The series starred María Elena Dávila, Pedro Moreno, Mauricio Mejía, Cristina Bernal, Frances Ondiviela and featured Lupita Ferrer in her return to telenovelas.

Cast
 Pedro Moreno as Rodrigo Karam
 Marielena Dávila as Matilda Ramos
 Mauricio Mejía as Santiago
 Cristina Bernal as Gabriela "Brela" Ramos 
 Frances Ondiviela as Pilar Amezcua
 Cecilia Gabriela as Aidé Karam
 Harry Geithner as Doroteo Galíndez
 Fernando Carrera as Rómulo Karam
 Emeraude Toubia as Stephanie Karam 
 Roberto Mateos as Gavito
 Víctor Cámara as Juan Ramón Amezcua
 Lupita Ferrer as Doña Elena Salas 
 Eduardo Serrano as Don José Salas
 William Valdés as Gerardo Ramos
 Gaby Borges as María Del Pilar Amezcua
 Natasha Domínguez as Felicia Amezcua
 Maité Embil as Georgina de la Parra
 Adrián Di Monte as Armando
 Mariet Rodriguez as Michelle
 Mijail Mulkay as Mateo
 Ariel López Padilla as Marco Aurelio
 Alfredo Huereca as Francisco
 Lorena Gómez as Arantxa de la Parra
 Catalina Mesa as Livi
 Ana Sobero as Beatriz Higuiera
 Angela Rincón as Yuli
 Marina Ruiz as Maricarmen Aguirre
 Rosalinda Rodríguez as Remedios
 Samuel Sadovnik as Alexis
 Alberto Salaberry as Alejandro Olmedo
 Daniela Botero as Licd. Julia Basáñez
 Martha Picanes as  Beatriz's mother
 Eduardo Ibarrola as Hector
 Enrique Montaño as Raimundo
 Guido Massri as Prof. Samuel Ruiz “Pelón”
 Alejandro Bueno as child of Michelle & Mateo
 Pablo Bueno as child of Michelle & Mateo

Notes

References

External links

2014 American television series debuts
Spanish-language American telenovelas
Univision telenovelas
Venezuelan telenovelas
Venevisión telenovelas
2014 telenovelas
2015 American television series endings
2014 Venezuelan television series debuts
2015 Venezuelan television series endings
American telenovelas
American television series based on telenovelas
American television series based on Venezuelan television series